Sirkazhi is a state assembly constituency in Tamil Nadu. The constituency is reserved for Scheduled Caste (SC) candidates. It is one of the 234 State Legislative Assembly Constituencies in Tamil Nadu, in India.

 The assembly seat has been won by Dravida Munnetra Kazhagam (DMK) in 1977, 1989, 1996 and 2006 elections and Anna Dravida Munnetra Kazhagam (ADMK) in 1980, 1984, 1991, 2001 and 2011. , the MLA of the constituency is M. Panneerselvam from the DMK.

Madras State

Tamil Nadu

Election results

2021

2016

2011

2006

2001

1996

1991

1989

1984

1980

1977

1971

1967

1962

1957

1952

References 

 
 
 

Assembly constituencies of Tamil Nadu